Estadio Parque Capurro is a multi-use stadium in Montevideo, Uruguay.  It is currently used primarily for football matches.  The stadium holds 10,000 people and is the home stadium of Centro Atlético Fénix.

References

External links
 Estadio Parque Capurro

Parque Capurro
P
Centro Atlético Fénix
Capurro